The 1929–30 SK Rapid Wien season was the 32nd season in club history.

Squad

Squad and statistics

Squad statistics

Fixtures and results

League

Cup

Mitropa Cup

References

1929-30 Rapid Wien Season
Rapid
Austrian football championship-winning seasons